Noake is a surname. Notable people with the surname include:

Hiroyuki Noake (born 1974), Japanese speed skater
John Noake (1816–1894), English journalist and antiquary
William Noake (1690–1737), High Sheriff of Berkshire, England

See also
Noakes (disambiguation)